Polio v/s Polio Victims is the National Award Winning Documentary film. The documentary won "Best Motivational/ Educational Film" at the 56th National Film Awards. The documentary follows a group of polio victims who took to the streets in 2008 to spread the message of the Pulse Polio Campaign. The film follows them as they go door to door, in various slums in Mumbai, to spread awareness about the upcoming "Pulse Polio Day".
The film is written by Samrat Rane and directed by Aman Sachdeva.

External links
 News of National Film Award
 http://www.adclubbombay.com/index.php?option=cocontent&view=article&id=2796&catid=34&Itemid=34
 http://article.wn.com/view/2010/0=/Ad_film_on_the_pulse_polio_drive_wins_the_National_Film_Awar/
 http://epaper.dnaindia.com/epapermain.adate=3%2f31%2f2010
 http://archive.wn.com/2010/04/01/1400/slumnews/
 http://www.dnaindia.com/lifestyle/report/ad-film-on-the-pulse-polio-drive-wins-the-national-film-award_15566

Films about infectious diseases
Indian documentary films
Documentary films about people with disability